Paul Leidy (November 13, 1813 – September 11, 1877) was a Democratic member of the U.S. House of Representatives from Pennsylvania, serving one term from 1857 to 1859.

Biography
Paul Leidy was born in Hemlock Township, Pennsylvania, son of John and Sarah (Girton) Leidy. His father died when Paul was in his teens and a guardian, Samuel Brugler, was appointed for him in 1831.  He attended the common schools and apprenticed as a tailor at about age 16.  He taught school in Danville, Pennsylvania, for several years beginning about 1838 and simultaneously, he studied law.

He was admitted to the bar in 1837 and commenced practice in Danville. His obituary states that, "He applied himself diligently to his chosen profession and built up a lucrative practice."  He served as district attorney of Montour County, Pennsylvania from 1852 to 1857.

Congress
Leidy was elected as a Democrat to the Thirty-fifth Congress to fill the vacancy caused by the death of John G. Montgomery. During his term, congress was involved in the dispute regarding the admission of Kansas as a state, a topic on which Leidy addressed the House (30 March 1858). He was an unsuccessful candidate for reelection in 1858.

Personal life
Paul Leidy was married three times.  He married Jane Fruit Kitchen in 1842, by whom he had seven children. He was married to Eloise Hill in 1870, and was also married to Margaret Montgomery.

Death
He died in Danville in 1877.  Interment in the Odd Fellows Cemetery.

Sources

The Political Graveyard

Pennsylvania lawyers
People from Columbia County, Pennsylvania
People from Montour County, Pennsylvania
1813 births
Democratic Party members of the United States House of Representatives from Pennsylvania
1877 deaths
19th-century American politicians
19th-century American lawyers